Matthew Maguire (April 5, 1842 – January 9, 1915) was a New Jersey machinist. In 1896, Maguire was the vice-presidential nominee of the Socialist Labor Party of America. Running on the ticket alongside Charles H. Matchett, the pair were on 20 state ballots and received 36,367 votes. The campaign received more votes than any other SLP ticket until 1944.

References

Socialist Labor Party of America politicians from New Jersey
Socialist Labor Party of America vice presidential nominees
1896 United States vice-presidential candidates
Trade unionists from New Jersey
1842 births
1915 deaths